"Fourteen Minutes Old" is a song written by A.L. "Doodle" Owens and Dennis Knutson, and recorded by American country music artist Doug Stone.  It was released in June 1990 as the second single from his self titled debut album.  It peaked at number 6 on the Billboard Hot Country Singles & Tracks chart and number 5 on The Canadian RPM Tracks chart.

Content
The song's narrator is at home by himself, counting the minutes since his lover left: "There's still some coffee in her cup / And it's not even cold / And her memory's only 14 minutes old." This line changes to 15, then 16 minutes as the song progresses.

Chart performance

Year-end charts

References

1990 songs
1990 singles
Doug Stone songs
Songs written by A.L. "Doodle" Owens
Epic Records singles
Song recordings produced by Doug Johnson (record producer)
Songs written by Dennis Knutson